is a passenger railway station located in the city of Kuwana, Mie Prefecture, Japan, operated by the private railway operator Sangi Railway. The station is immediately adjacent to Kuwana Station, which services the Kansai Main Line, Kintetsu Nagoya Line and the Yōrō Line. The station is used primarily by morning and evening commuters to school and work.  Many passengers proceed on to Nagoya and Yokkaichi via Kintetsu and JR at Kuwana Station.

Lines
Nishi-Kuwana Station is a terminus of the Hokusei Line, and is located 20.4 kilometres from the opposing terminus of the line at Ageki Station.

Layout
The station consists of a single dead-headed side platform.

Platforms

Adjacent stations

History
April 5, 1914:  Station opens as part of Hokusei Railway under the name of Ōyamada Station (大山田駅　Ōyamada-eki).
July 8, 1931:  Station officially renamed Nishi-Kuwana Station.
June 27, 1934:  Hokusei Railway officially renamed Hokusei Electric Railway.
February 11, 1944:  Station falls under the ownership of Sanco following merger.
November 1, 1961:  Kuwana-Kyōbashi ~ Nishi-Kuwana section of Hokusei Line closes.  Nishi-Kuwana becomes origin of Hokusei Line.
February 1, 1964:  Station falls under the ownership of Mie Electric Railway after railway division of Sanco splits off and forms separate company.
April 1, 1965:  Station falls under the ownership of Kintetsu following merger.
May 1, 1977:  Station moved slightly to the south.
April 1, 2003:  Kintetsu transfers control of Hokusei Line to Sangi Railway.  Station falls under the ownership of Sangi.
August 31, 2003:  Heating and air conditioning installed in passenger waiting room.
December 1, 2003:  Automatic ticket gates installed.  Fair adjustment machine installed.
March 26, 2005:  Hokusei Line control station moved from Nishi-Kuwana to Tōin.

Passenger statistics
In fiscal 2019, the station was used by an average of 2662 passengers daily (boarding passengers only).

Surrounding area
Kuwana Station (JR, Kintetsu, and Yōrō Railway)
Nagashima Spa Land (via bus)
Kuwana City Hall
Kyūka Park, site of the old Kuwana Castle
Part of Kuwana-juku, a station of the Tōkaidō
Apita shopping center

See also
List of railway stations in Japan

References

External links
}
Sangi Railway official home page

Railway stations in Japan opened in 1914
Railway stations in Mie Prefecture
Kuwana, Mie